This article presents a list of the historical events and publications of Australian literature during 1861.

Poetry 

 Charles Harpur – "To My Infant Daughter Ada"
 Basil E. Kendall – "Florence : A Song"
 Henry Kendall
 "Fainting by the Way"
 "The Wail in the Native Oak"

Births 

A list, ordered by date of birth (and, if the date is either unspecified or repeated, ordered alphabetically by surname) of births in 1861 of Australian literary figures, authors of written works or literature-related individuals follows, including year of death.

 12 January – Jack Moses, poet (died 1945)
 20 February – Mary Gaunt, novelist (died 1942)
 19 June – Ethel Castilla, journalist, poet and short story writer (died 1937)

See also 
 1861 in Australia
 1861 in literature
 1861 in poetry
 List of years in literature
 List of years in Australian literature

References

 
Australia
19th-century Australian literature
Australian literature by year